The 200-metre individual medley is a race in competitive swimming in which swimmers compete in all 4 strokes (butterfly, backstroke, breaststroke, and freestyle) in one race, with each leg being 50 metres in length. The stroke order is different to the team variant of this race. Michael Phelps is famous for his four-peat at the Olympics, winning the event at each Olympic Games from 2004 to 2016, the only swimmer to have ever won four successive gold medals at the same event.

Description
Swimmers start by diving off the block and swimming 50 metres of the butterfly stroke, and then touching the wall with both hands and turning into 50 metres of backstroke. There are two different ways you can turn on the wall in the backstroke-to-breaststroke transition. The most common is a one-handed touch to the wall and simply rotating your body to push off. The second possible turn is a cross overturn. This is when the swimmer touches the wall on their side and then flipping their legs over their head. After the turn, the swimmer completes 50 metres of breaststroke. They finish the race with 50 metres of freestyle.

Records
World Record (SCM) men: Ryan Lochte (United States), 1:49.63
World Record (LCM) men: Ryan Lochte (United States), 1:54.00
Order: 50 metres butterfly, 50 metres backstroke, 50 metres breaststroke, 50 metres freestyle
Number of lengths (SCM): 8
Number of lengths (LCM): 4

See also
Medley swimming
World record progression 200 metres medley

References

200 metre individual medley
Medley swimming